Aline Danioth (born 12 March 1998) is a Swiss World Cup alpine ski racer.

She competed at the World Championships in 2019, winning a gold medal in the team event, and was fifteenth in the slalom.
At the 2022 Winter Olympics she came 10th in the slalom.

World Cup results

Season standings

Top tens
 1 top ten (1 SL)

World Championship results

Olympic results

References

External links

Aline Danioth World Cup standings at the International Ski Federation

Swiss Ski team – official site – 
Stöckli Skis – athletes – Aline Danioth

1998 births
Living people
Swiss female alpine skiers
Youth Olympic gold medalists for Switzerland
Alpine skiers at the 2016 Winter Youth Olympics
Alpine skiers at the 2022 Winter Olympics
Olympic alpine skiers of Switzerland
21st-century Swiss women
Youth Olympic bronze medalists for Switzerland